Prisionera is a Mexican telenovela produced by Televisa for Telesistema Mexicano in 1962.

Cast 
Anita Blanch
 
Maricruz Olivier

References

External links 

Mexican telenovelas
1962 telenovelas
Televisa telenovelas
1962 Mexican television series debuts
1962 Mexican television series endings
Spanish-language telenovelas